This is a list of seasons played by Maccabi Netanya Football Club in Israeli and European football, from 1937–38 (when the club first competed in the league) to the most recent completed season. It details the club's achievements in major competitions, and the top scorers for each season. Top scorers in bold were also the top scorers in the Israeli league that season. Records of minor competitions such as the Lilian Cup are not included due to them being considered of less importance than the State Cup and the Toto Cup.

History
Maccabi Netanya was established in 1934 and was first promoted to the top division ahead of the 1943–44 season. The club stayed at the top division until the end of the 1961–62 season. After returning to the top division two seasons later, the club went on to win 5 championships.
In 1994–95 The club finished bottom of Liga Leumit and were relegated to Liga Artzit, returning to the top division in 1998–99. However, the club was relegated again in 2003–04 after finishing second from bottom, though they made an immediate return to the top division after finishing as Liga Leumit runners-up the following season. The club finished as runners-up in the league in 2006–07 and 2007–08, but as the club met financial difficulties, it went into administration and relegated to the second division.

Seasons

Key

 P = Played
 W = Games won
 D = Games drawn
 L = Games lost
 F = Goals for
 A = Goals against
 Pts = Points
 Pos = Final position

 Leumit = Liga Leumit (National League)
 Artzit = Liga Artzit (Nationwide League)
 Premier = Liga Al (Premier League)
 Pal. League = Palestine League

 F = Final
 Group = Group stage
 QF = Quarter-finals
 QR1 = First Qualifying Round
 QR2 = Second Qualifying Round
 QR3 = Third Qualifying Round
 QR4 = Fourth Qualifying Round
 RInt = Intermediate Round

 R1 = Round 1
 R2 = Round 2
 R3 = Round 3
 R4 = Round 4
 R5 = Round 5
 R6 = Round 6
 SF = Semi-finals

Notes

References

Maccabi Netanya F.C.
 
Maccabi Netanya